Suhaizan bin Kayat is a Malaysian politician who has served as the Political Secretary to the Minister of Domestic Trade and Living Costs Salahuddin Ayub since January 2023. He served as Speaker of the Johor State Legislative Assembly from June 2018 to January 2022. He is a member of the National Trust Party (AMANAH), a component party of the Pakatan Harapan (PH) coalition.

Education
He received his early education at Sekolah Kebangsaan Parit Nawi, Muar and Sekolah Agama Seri Menanti, Muar (Special Degree). Then he continued his secondary schooling at Sekolah Menengah Seri Menanti, Muar and finally at Sekolah Agama Parit Nawi.

After graduating from high school, he continued his studies at the university and was awarded a bachelor's degree and Master of Computer Science from Universiti Teknologi Malaysia, Skudai.

He is active in the student association at Universiti Teknologi Malaysia. Among the positions he holds, include as Exco and Vice President of the UTM Student Association.

Community activities
He is also active in community activities. He has been appointed as the Development Secretary of Taman Universiti Skudai Mosque, Secretary of the Movement to Abolish PPSMI (GMP), Secretary of the People's Land Coalition (TANAH), Advisor of the Kempas People's Action Action Committee and Simpang Renggam People's Action Committee Advisor.

Politics
He started venturing into politics by joining PAS. Among his important positions in PAS, include as Johor PAS Youth Council Chief, Central PAS Youth Council Information Chief, Gelang Patah PAS Youth Council Chief, Pulai PAS Committee Member and Pos Malaysia Voting Committee Chairman.

He was appointed as the Speaker of the Johor State Legislative Assembly by former Menteri Besar Osman Sapian from Pakatan Harapan (PH) on 28 June 2018 after Barisan Nasional (BN) state administration was overthrown in 2018 state election and has been retained as Speaker by Menteri Besar Hasni Mohammad from BN even the PH state administration was overthrown by BN in February 2020. Hence, this became one of a few cases which the speaker is from the opposition instead of either being independent or from the government. He was the only speaker from the opposition in Malaysia. After BN returned to the state government following its victory in the 2022 Johor state election, he and Gan Peck Cheng were not reappointed as speaker and deputy speaker of the assembly.

Election results

References 

1973 births
Living people
Johor
Malaysian people of Malay descent
National Trust Party (Malaysia) politicians
Former Malaysian Islamic Party politicians
Speakers of the Johor State Legislative Assembly
21st-century Malaysian politicians